The Sunset League was a minor league baseball circuit that operated from 1947 through 1950.

The Sunset League was a Class C level league, with franchises based in the United States and Mexico. The league expanded from six to eight teams from 1949 to 1950. There was a previous league called the "Sunset League" that briefly played in Texas in the 1902 season.

For the 1951 season, the circuit merged with the Arizona–Texas League to form the Southwest International League.

History
In 1902, a "Sunset League" included Beaumont (8–4), Lake Charles (7–6), Crowley (6–6) and Houston (3–8). Records are from the May 27, 1902 Houston Daily Post and are not official.

The Sunset League was one of many short–lived minor leagues of the late 1940s  and early 1950s. The Class C level circuit ran from 1947 through 1950. Las Vegas, El Centro and Riverside were members every year. It was an extremely high offensive league; in 1947, Las Vegas averaged 9 runs a game and finished 73–67. The league merged with the Arizona-Texas League in 1951 to form the Southwest International League.

Cities represented
Anaheim, CA: Anaheim Valencias (1947); Anaheim/San Bernardino Valencias (1948)
El Centro, CA: El Centro Imperials (1947–1950)
Las Vegas, NV: Las Vegas Wranglers (1947–1950)
Mexicali, Baja California: Mexicali Eagles (1948–1949)
Ontario, CA: Ontario Orioles (1947)
Porterville, CA: Porterville Packers (1949–1950)
Reno, NV:Reno Silver Sox (1947–1949)
Riverside, CA:Riverside Dons (1947; 1949); Riverside Rubes (1948; 1950)
Salinas, CA:Salinas Colts (1949)
San Bernardino, CA:San Bernardino Pioneers (1949–1950)
Tijuana, Baja CA:Tijuana Potros (1949–1950)
Yuma, AZ:Yuma Panthers (1950)

Standings & statistics

1947 to 1948
1947 Sunset League
 Playoffs: Riverside 3 games, Las Vegas 0; Anaheim 3 games, Ontario 0. Finals: Anaheim 4 games, Riverside 1. 
 
1948 Sunset League schedule
Anaheim (13–42) moved to San Bernardino June 25. Playoffs: Reno 3 games, Mexicali 0; Las Vegas 3 games, Riverside 1. Finals: Reno 3 games, Las Vegas 2.

1949 to 1950 
1949 Sunset Leagueschedule
Salinas moved to Tijuana August 5. Playoffs: None Scheduled. 
 
1950 Sunset Leagueschedule
 Playoffs: Mexicali 2 games, Las Vegas 1; El Centro 2 games, Riverside 1. Finals: El Centro 2 games, Mexicali 1.

Championship teams
 1947 – Anaheim Valencias
 1948 – Reno Silver Sox
 1949 – Las Vegas Wranglers *
 1950 – El Centro Imperials
  * Playoffs were not played

References
 Johnson, Lloyd; Wolff, Miles (1993). Encyclopedia of Minor League Baseball. Baseball America.

External links
 Baseball Reference – 1947 Sunset League
 Baseball Reference – 1948 Sunset League
 Baseball Reference – 1949 Sunset League
 Baseball Reference – 1950 Sunset League
 Mike McCann's Minor League Baseball Page

1947 establishments in the United States
1950 disestablishments in the United States
Baseball leagues in California
Defunct minor baseball leagues in the United States
Baseball leagues in Nevada
Baseball leagues in Arizona